Jacob Hergenhahn (November 12, 1881 – May 20, 1966) was an American gymnast. He competed in three events at the 1904 Summer Olympics.

References

External links
 

1881 births
1966 deaths
American male artistic gymnasts
Olympic gymnasts of the United States
Gymnasts at the 1904 Summer Olympics
Sportspeople from Ludwigshafen
20th-century American people